This is a list in alphabetical order of cricketers who have played for Warwickshire in top-class matches since 1894. Founded in 1882, the club held minor status until it was classified as an unofficial first-class team by substantial sources in 1894; Warwickshire has been classified as a List A team since the beginning of limited overs cricket in 1963; and as a first-class Twenty20 team since the inauguration of the Twenty20 Cup in 2003.

The details are the player's usual name followed by the years in which he was active as a Warwickshire player and then his name is given as it usually appears on match scorecards. Note that many players represented other top-class teams besides Warwickshire and that some played for the club in minor counties cricket before 1894. Current players are shown as active to the latest season in which they played for the club. The list excludes Second XI and other players who did not play for the club's first team; and players whose first team appearances were in minor matches only.

A
 Neal Abberley (1964–1979) : R. N. Abberley (258 matches)
 Roy Abell (1967) : R. B. Abell (1)
 Mark Adair (2015–2016) : M. R. Adair (2)
 Charles Adderley (1946) : C. H. Adderley (5)
 Ashton Agar (2019) : A. C. Agar (T20 only)
 Jimmy Allan (1966–1968) : J. M. Allan (48)
 Sandy Allen (2002) : A. P. W. Allen (1)
 Tom Allin (2013) : T. W. Allin (1)
 Darren Altree (1996–2000) : D. A. Altree (6)
 Tim Ambrose (2006–2019) : T. R. Ambrose (190)
 Dennis Amiss (1960–1987) : D. L. Amiss (547)
 James Anyon (2005–2009) : J. E. Anyon (41)
 Asif Din (1981–1994) : Asif Din (210)
 Ateeq Javid (2009–2017) : Ateeq Javid (32)
 Jamie Atkinson (2013) : J. J. Atkinson
 Harry Austin (1919) : H. Austin (4)

B
 Herbert Bainbridge (1894–1902) : H. W. Bainbridge (118)
 Charles Baker (1905–1920) : C. S. Baker (214)
 Michael Balac (2008) : M. Balac (1)
 David Banks (1988–1989) : D. A. Banks (11)
 Liam Banks (2017–2019) : L. Banks (10)
 Jack Bannister (1950–1968) : J. D. Bannister (368)
 Eric Barber (1936) : E. G. Barber (2)
 Bob Barber (1963–1969) : R. W. Barber (124)
 William Barber (1927–1933) : W. H. Barber (5)
 Alfred Barbery (1906–1907) : A. E. Barbery (2)
 Keith Barker (2009–2018) : K. H. D. Barker (113)
 Maurice Barker (1946) : M. P. Barker (5)
 Michael Barnes (2007) : M. W. Barnes (1)
 Sydney Barnes (1894–1896) : S. F. Barnes (4)
 Terry Barnes (1956) : T. P. Barnes (1)
 Joseph Barton (1895–1896) : J. Barton (3)
 Leonard Bates (1913–1935) : L. T. A. Bates (441)
 Samuel Bates (1910–1912) : S. H. Bates (5)
 Martin Bayley (1969) : M. G. Bayley (2)
 Robert Baynton (1921–1923) : R. G. Baynton (13)
 Ian Bell (1999–2020) : I. R. Bell (163)
 Michael Bell (1992–1997) : M. A. V. Bell (20)
 Harold Benjamin (1919) : H. L. Benjamin (2)
 Joey Benjamin (1988–1991) : J. E. Benjamin (25)
 Gwynfor Benson (1959–1961) : G. L. Benson (3)
 Paul Best (2011–2014) : P. M. Best (3)
 Melvyn Betts (2001–2003) : M. M. Betts (31)
 Ian Blackwell (2012) : I. D. Blackwell (4)
 Bill Blenkiron (1964–1974) : W. Blenkiron (117)
 Shane Bond (2002) : S. E. Bond (3)
 Paul Booth (1990–1993) : P. A. Booth (37)
 Ant Botha (2007–2011) : A. G. Botha (39)
 Bill Bourne (1973–1977) : W. A. Bourne (59)
 Carl Breeden (1910) : C. L. Breeden (5)
 Tim Bresnan (2020) : T. T. Bresnan (4)
 Vincent Brewster (1965) : V. C. Brewster (2)
 Basil Bridge (1955–1968) : W. B. Bridge (98)
 Reginald Brindle (1949) : R. G. Brindle (1)
 Ralph Broberg (1920) : R. F. Broberg (1)
 Philip Bromley (1947–1956) : P. H. Bromley (49)
 Ethan Brookes (2019–2020) : E. A. Brookes (2)
 Henry Brookes (2017–2020) : H. J. H. Brookes (19)
 Albert Brown (1932) : A. Brown (1)
 David Brown (1961–1982) : D. J. Brown (326)
 Dougie Brown (1991–2007) : D. R. Brown (197)
 Eddie Brown (1932–1934) : E. Brown (28)
 John Brown (1913–1914) : J. D. Brown (9)
 John Buckingham (1933–1939) : J. Buckingham (93)
 Michael Burgess (2019–2020) : M. G. K. Burgess (10)
 Mike Burns (1992–1996) : M. Burns (20)
 Reginald Burton (1919) : R. H. M. Burton (1)
 Harold Busher (1908) : H. A. Busher (1)
 George Byrne (1912) : G. R. Byrne (8)
 James Byrne (1897–1912) : J. F. Byrne (138)

C
 Freddie Calthorpe (1919–1930) : F. S. G. Calthorpe (231)
 Victor Cannings (1947–1949) : V. H. D. Cannings (53)
 Neil Carter (2001–2012) : N. M. Carter (102)
 Ray Carter (1951–1961) : R. G. Carter (88)
 Tom Cartwright (1952–1969) : T. W. Cartwright (353)
 Maurice Chambers (2013) : M. A. Chambers (4)
 Shivnarine Chanderpaul (2011) : S. Chanderpaul (5)
 Crowther Charlesworth (1898–1921) : C. Charlesworth (372)
 Varun Chopra (2010–2016) : V. Chopra (107)
 Shaaiq Choudhry (2009) : S. H. Choudhry (1)
 Michael Clark (2003) : M. W. Clark (1)
 Rikki Clarke (2008–2017) : R. Clarke (131)
 William Clarkson (1922–1923) : W. Clarkson (2)
 John Claughton (1979–1980) : J. A. Claughton (18)
 Christopher Clifford (1978–1980) : C. C. Clifford (36)
 Ian Clifford (2002) : J. I. Clifford (4)
 Lin Clugston (1928–1946) : D. L. Clugston (6)
 Freddie Coleman (2015) : F. R. J. Coleman (1)
 Tom Collin (1933–1936) : T. Collin (52)
 Corey Collymore (2003) : C. D. Collymore (5)
 David Cook (1962–1968) : D. R. Cook (9)
 Michael Cook (1961–1962) : M. S. Cook (2)
 Robert Cooke (1925–1926) : R. Cooke (15)
 John Cordner (1952) : J. P. Cordner (1)
 Robert Cotton (1947) : R. H. Cotton (2)
 Charles Cowan (1909–1921) : C. F. R. Cowan (27)
 Peter Cranmer (1934–1954) : P. Cranmer (166)
 Alexander Crawford (1911) : A. B. Crawford (7)
 Joseph Cresswell (1895–1899) : J. Cresswell (15)
 Henry Crichton (1908) : H. T. Crichton (2)
 Eric Crockford (1911–1922) : E. B. Crockford (21)
 Alfred Croom (1922–1939) : A. J. W. Croom (394)
 Leslie Croom (1949) : L. C. B. Croom (4)
 Anthony Cross (1969) : A. J. Cross (1)
 Eric Cross (1921–1923) : E. P. Cross (7)
 Jim Cumbes (1982) : J. Cumbes (14)
 Arthur Curle (1920) : A. C. Curle (3)
 Gerald Curle (1913) : G. Curle (5)

D
 Lee Daggett (2006–2008) : L. M. Daggett (12)
 Charles Dagnall (1999–2001) : C. E. Dagnall (6)
 Conrad Davies (1930–1936) : C. S. S. Davies (8)
 Richard Davies (1976) : R. J. Davies (1)
 Richard Davis (1993/94–1995) : R. P. Davis (20)
 Stewie Dempster (1946) : C. S. Dempster (3)
 Jack Devey (1894–1907) : J. H. G. Devey (153)
 Frederick Dickens (1898–1903) : F. Dickens (29)
 Edwin Diver (1894–1901) : E. J. Diver (118)
 Frederick Dobson (1928) : F. Dobson (3)
 Kenneth Dobson (1925) : K. W. C. Dobson (2)
 Ludford Docker (1894–1895) : L. C. Docker (11)
 Tom Dollery (1934–1955) : H. E. Dollery (413)
 Keith Dollery (1951–1956) : K. R. Dollery (73)
 Allan Donald (1987–2000) : A. A. Donald (141)
 Martin Donnelly (1948–1950) : M. P. Donnelly (20)
 Dilip Doshi (1980–1981) : D. R. Doshi (43)
 Vasbert Drakes (2001) : V. C. Drakes (14)
 Paul Dunkels (1971) : P. R. Dunkels (1)
 Thomas Durnell (1921–1930) : T. W. Durnell (14)
 Robin Dyer (1981–1986) : R. I. H. B. Dyer (65)

E
 Michael Edmond (1996–1999) : M. D. Edmond (8)
 Roger Edmonds (1962–1967) : R. B. Edmonds (78)
 Gus Elson (1947) : G. Elson (1)
 Stuart Eustace (2005) : S. M. Eustace (1)
 Laurie Evans (2010–2016) : L. J. Evans (45)
 Russell Everitt (1909) : R. S. Everitt (3)

F
 Arthur Fabling (1921) : A. H. Fabling (1)
 Bill Fantham (1935–1948) : W. E. Fantham (63)
 George Farren (1912) : G. C. Farren (1)
 Anton Ferreira (1979–1986) : A. M. Ferreira (138)
 Charles Fiddian-Green (1920–1928) : C. A. F. Fiddian-Green (64)
 Frank Field (1897–1920) : E. F. Field (256)
 Max Field (1974–1975) : M. N. Field (3)
 Tom Fishwick (1896–1909) : T. S. Fishwick (206)
 Kevin Flaherty (1969) : K. F. Flaherty (1)
 Barry Fletcher (1956–1961) : B. E. Fletcher (49)
 Barry Flick (1969–1973) : B. J. Flick (16)
 Derrick Flint (1948–1949) : D. Flint (10)
 Russell Flower (1978) : R. W. Flower (9)
 Thomas Forrester (1896–1899) : T. Forrester (26)
 Arthur Foster (1914) : A. W. Foster (1)
 Derek Foster (1928–1934) : D. G. Foster (52)
 Frank Foster (1908–1914) : F. R. Foster (127)
 John Fox (1922–1928) : J. Fox (46)
 Jackie Fox (1959–1961) : J. G. Fox (43)
 Reginald Franklin (1900) : R. C. Franklin (1)
 Tony Frost (1997–2009) : T. Frost (120)

G
 Fred Gardner (1947–1961) : F. C. Gardner (338)
 Keith Gardom (1973–1974) : B. K. Gardom (17)
 George Garrett (2019) : G. A. Garrett (3)
 Howard Gaunt (1919–1922) : H. C. A. Gaunt (11)
 Billy George (1901–1906) : W. George (13)
 Lance Gibbs (1967–1973) : L. R. Gibbs (109)
 Ed Giddins (1998–2000) : E. S. H. Giddins (41)
 Norman Gifford (1983–1988) : N. Gifford (139)
 Ashley Giles (1993–2005) : A. F. Giles (100)
 Albert Gittins (1919) : A. E. Gittins (2)
 John Glassford (1969) : J. Glassford (2)
 Alfred Glover (1895–1909) : A. C. S. Glover (149)
 Brian Glynn (1959–1961) : B. T. Glynn (2)
 Stanley Gobey (1946) : S. C. Gobey (2)
 Cyril Goodway (1937–1947) : C. C. Goodway (40)
 Harold Goodwin (1907–1912) : H. J. Goodwin (19)
 Alan Gordon (1966–1971) : A. Gordon (34)
 Recordo Gordon (2013–2014) : R. O. Gordon (6)
 Richard Granville (1934) : R. S. Granville (1)
 John Gray (1968–1969) : J. D. Gray (7)
 Albert Grayland (1922–1930) : A. V. Grayland (4)
 Chris Green (2019) : C. J. Green (T20 only)
 John Green (1927) : J. H. Green (1)
 Simon Green (1988–1991) : S. J. Green (5)
 Thomas Greening (1912) : T. Greening (2)
 Shirley Griffiths (1956–1958) : S. S. Griffiths (27)
 Tim Groenewald (2006–2008) : T. D. Groenewald (17)
 Frederick Gross (1934) : F. A. Gross (1)
 Charles Grove (1938–1953) : C. W. C. Grove (201)
 John Guy (1950) : J. B. Guy (2)

H
 John Hacking (1946) : J. K. Hacking (1)
 Sam Hain (2014–2020) : S. R. Hain (76)
 William Hall (1905) : W. Hall (2)
 William Hampton (1922) : W. M. Hampton (1)
 Barry Hands (1946–1947) : B. O. Hands (3)
 William Hands (1909–1920) : W. C. Hands (60)
 Oliver Hannon-Dalby (2012–2020) : O. J. Hannon-Dalby (50)
 Sam Hargreave (1899–1909) : S. Hargreave (188)
 Archibald Harris (1919) : A. J. Harris (1)
 Dennis Harris (1946) : D. F. Harris (1)
 Earl Harris (1975) : E. J. Harris (4)
 Paul Harris (2006–2007) : P. L. Harris (12)
 William Harris (1904–1919) : W. H. Harris (12)
 Paul Harrison (2005) : P. W. Harrison (1)
 Peter Hartley (1982) : P. J. Hartley (3)
 Bill Harvey (1927) : W. H. Harvey (1)
 Alec Hastilow (1919) : C. A. F. Hastilow (2)
 Christopher Hawkins (1957) : C. G. Hawkins (4)
 Albert Hayhurst (1934–1935) : A. Hayhurst (7)
 David Heath (1949–1953) : D. M. W. Heath (16)
 Mike Hellawell (1962) : M. S. Hellawell (1)
 Eddie Hemmings (1966–1978) : E. E. Hemmings (177)
 David Hemp (1997–2001) : D. L. Hemp (84)
 Edward Hewetson (1919–1927) : E. P. Hewetson (29)
 Eric Hewitt (1954) : E. J. Hewitt (1)
 George Hickman (1929) : G. Hickman (2)
 Thomas Hilditch (1907–1913) : T. A. Hilditch (8)
 Alfred Hill (1920) : A. J. B. Hill (1)
 Geoffrey Hill (1958–1960) : G. H. Hill (41)
 Henry Hill (1894–1900) : H. B. G. Hill (5)
 John Hill (1894–1898) : J. E. Hill (25)
 Aubrey Hill (1929–1948) : W. A. Hill (169)
 Raymond Hitchcock (1949–1964) : R. E. Hitchcock (319)
 Dean Hoffman (1985) : D. S. Hoffman (17)
 Brad Hogg (2004) : G. B. Hogg (12)
 Willie Hogg (1981–1983) : W. Hogg (50)
 William Holbech (1910) : W. H. Holbech (1)
 Romilly Holdsworth (1919–1921) : R. L. Holdsworth (30)
 Stuart Hole (2007–2008) : S. M. Hole (2)
 Eric Hollies (1932–1957) : W. E. Hollies (476)
 Piran Holloway (1988–1993) : P. C. L. Holloway (14)
 Maurice Holmes (2011) : M. G. Holmes (2)
 David Hopkins (1977–1981) : D. C. Hopkins (36)
 Frank Hopkins (1898–1903) : F. J. Hopkins (11)
 Norman Horner (1951–1965) : N. F. Horner (357)
 Adam Hose (2018–2020) : A. J. Hose (15)
 John Hossell (1939–1947) : J. J. Hossell (35)
 Eric Houghton (1946–1947) : W. E. Houghton (7)
 Albert Howell (1919–1922) : A. L. Howell (34)
 Harry Howell (1913–1928) : H. Howell (198)
 Geoff Humpage (1974–1990) : G. W. Humpage (345)
 Alfred Hyde (1905–1907) : A. J. Hyde (2)

I
 Edward Illingworth (1920) : E. A. Illingworth (6)
 Imran Tahir (2010) : Imran Tahir (16)

J
 Arnold Jackson (1928–1931) : A. K. Jackson (2)
 Nick James (2008) : N. A. James (1)
 John Jameson (1960–1976) : J. A. Jameson (345)
 Thomas Jameson (1970) : T. E. N. Jameson (1)
 Harold Jarrett (1932–1933) : H. H. Jarrett (14)
 Percy Jeeves (1912–1914) : P. Jeeves (49)
 George Jennings (1923–1925) : G. A. Jennings (20)
 Richard Johnson (2008–2012) : R. M. Johnson (11)
 Keith Jones (1969–1973) : A. K. C. Jones (4)
 Richard Jones (2013–2015) : R. A. Jones (5)
 Richard Jones (1946) : R. H. Jones (1)

K
 Alvin Kallicharran (1971–1990) : A. I. Kallicharran (285)
 Rohan Kanhai (1968–1977) : R. B. Kanhai (173)
 Abdul Hafeez Kardar (1948–1950) : A. H. Kardar (45)
 Vikai Kelley (2020) : V. V. Kelley
 George Kemp-Welch (1927–1935) : G. D. Kemp-Welch (57)
 Jack Kendall (1948–1949) : J. T. Kendall (4)
 John Kennedy (1960–1962) : J. M. Kennedy (31)
 Kenneth Kent (1927–1931) : K. G. Kent (9)
 Kevin Kerr (1986) : K. J. Kerr (14)
 Khalid Ibadulla (1954–1972) : Khalid Ibadulla (377)
 Norman Kilner (1924–1937) : N. Kilner (330)
 Edmund King (1928–1932) : E. H. King (7)
 Ian King (1952–1955) : I. M. King (53)
 James Kingston (1894) : J. P. Kingston (1)
 Septimus Kinneir (1898–1914) : S. Kinneir (302)
 Edwin Kirk (1898) : E. Kirk (1)
 Harold Kirton (1925–1929) : H. O. Kirton (2)
 Frederik Klokker (2006) : F. A. Klokker (1)
 Nick Knight (1994/95–2006) : N. V. Knight (153)
 Herbert Knutton (1894) : H. J. Knutton (1)

L
 Matthew Lamb (2016–2020) : M. J. Lamb (19)
 Albert Lane (1919–1925) : A. F. Lane (12)
 Colin Langley (1908–1914) : C. K. Langley (33)
 Brian Lara (1994–1998) : B. C. Lara (30)
 Hubert Latham (1955–1959) : H. J. Latham (10)
 Alfred Law (1894–1899) : A. Law (52)
 Clive Leach (1955–1958) : C. W. Leach (39)
 Eddie Leadbeater (1957–1958) : E. Leadbeater (27)
 Eddie Legard (1962–1968) : E. Legard (20)
 Christopher Lethbridge (1981–1985) : C. Lethbridge (50)
 Peter Lewington (1970–1982) : P. J. Lewington (69)
 Esmond Lewis (1949–1958) : E. B. Lewis (43)
 Dick Lilley (1894–1911) : A. F. A. Lilley (321)
 Jake Lintott (2020) : J. B. Lintott
 Andy Lloyd (1976–1992) : T. A. Lloyd (299)
 Bryan Lobb (1953) : B. Lobb (1)
 Gordon Lord (1983–1986) : G. J. Lord (18)
 William Lord (1897–1899) : W. A. Lord (13)
 Alex Loudon (2005–2007) : A. G. R. Loudon (46)
 Frank Loveitt (1898–1905) : F. R. Loveitt (25)
 John Lowe (1907) : J. C. M. Lowe (1)
 Peter Lowe (1964) : P. J. Lowe (1)
 Verner Luckin (1919) : V. V. Luckin (9)
 John Lynes (1897–1905) : J. Lynes (8)

M
 Calum MacLeod (2008–2009) : C. S. MacLeod (2)
 Darren Maddy (2007–2013) : D. L. Maddy (70)
 George Maddy (2022) : G. W. Maddy (2)
 Keith Maguire (1982) : K. R. Maguire (3)
 Joseph Manton (1898) : J. Manton (1)
 Francis Marshall (1922) : F. W. Marshall (2)
 Gordon Marshall (1961–1963) : G. A. Marshall (4)
 Jack Marshall (1946–1950) : J. M. A. Marshall (28)
 Chris Martin (2008) : C. S. Martin (6)
 Edward Matheson (1899) : E. Matheson (1)
 Ron Maudsley (1946–1951) : R. H. Maudsley (45)
 Joseph Mayer (1926–1939) : J. H. Mayer (332)
 Chris Maynard (1977–1982) : C. Maynard (24)
 Jamie McDowall (1969–1973) : J. I. McDowall (12)
 Peter McKay (2013–2015) : P. J. McKay (5)
 Brian McMillan (1986) : B. M. McMillan (12)
 Norman McVicker (1969–1973) : N. M. McVicker (104)
 Richard Mead-Briggs (1946) : R. Mead-Briggs (2)
 Tom Mees (2005) : T. Mees (1)
 William Meldon (1909–1910) : W. W. Meldon (5)
 Alex Mellor (2016–2017) : A. J. Mellor (7)
 James Melville (1946) : J. Melville (2)
 Michael Mence (1962–1965) : M. D. Mence (31)
 Tony Merrick (1987–1989) : T. A. Merrick (34)
 Chris Metters (2011) : C. L. Metters (10)
 James Meunier (1920) : J. B. Meunier (2)
 Ben Mike (2019) : B. W. M. Mike (2)
 Edward Milburn (1987) : E. T. Milburn (3)
 Craig Miles (2019–2020) : C. N. Miles (8)
 Andrew Miller (2008–2012) : A. S. Miller (18)
 Harry Miller (1928) : H. R. Miller (1)
 Ronnie Miller (1961–1968) : R. Miller (133)
 John Mills (1946) : J. M. Mills (4)
 Tom Milnes (2011–2019) : T. P. Milnes (15)
 Frank Mitchell (1946–1948) : F. R. Mitchell (17)
 Moeen Ali (2005–2006) : Moeen Ali (7)
 Mohammad Yousuf (2011) : Mohammad Yousuf (6)
 Andy Moles (1986–1997) : A. J. Moles
 Steve Monkhouse (1985–1986) : S. Monkhouse
 Tom Moody (1990) : T. M. Moody
 Fred Moorhouse (1900–1908) : F. Moorhouse
 Leonard Morris (1925–1926) : L. J. Morris
 Frank Morter (1922) : F. W. Morter
 John Morton (1929–1930) : J. Morton (9)
 William Morton (1984–1985) : W. Morton (10)
 Dan Mousley (2019–2020) : D. R. Mousley (3)
 Tim Munton (1985–1999) : T. A. Munton (212)
 Athol Murray (1922) : A. L. Murray (11)
 Deryck Murray (1972–1975) : D. L. Murray (58)
 Simon Myles (1988) : S. D. Myles (4)

N
 Naqaash Tahir (2004–2011) : Naqaash Tahir (56)
 Alfred Nelson (1895) : A. L. Nelson (1)
 Guy Nelson (1921–1922) : G. M. B. Nelson (13)
 Nathan Newport (2009) : N. A. Newport (1)
 Ernest Norton (cricketer) (1920) : E. W. Norton (2)
 Liam Norwell (2019–2020) : L. C. Norwell (5)
 Makhaya Ntini (2005) : M. Ntini (6)

O
 Dennis Oakes (1962–1965) : D. R. Oakes (5)
 Collins Obuya (2003) : C. O. Obuya (3)
 Alan Old (1969) : A. G. B. Old (1)
 Chris Old (1983–1985) : C. M. Old (47)
 Philip Oliver (cricketer) (1975–1982) : P. R. Oliver (89)
 James Ord (2010) : J. E. Ord (1)
 Jimmy Ord (1933–1953) : J. S. Ord (273)
 Christopher O'Rourke (1968) : C. O'Rourke (1)
 Dominic Ostler (1990–2003) : D. P. Ostler (201)

P
 George Paine (1929–1947) : G. A. E. Paine (240)
 Henry Pallett (1894–1898) : H. J. Pallett (73)
 George Palmer (1928) : G. A. Palmer (9)
 Luke Parker (2005–2008) : L. C. Parker (17)
 Howard Parkes (1898) : H. R. Parkes (1)
 Matthew Parry (1908–1910) : M. C. Parry (2)
 Gordon Parsons (1986–1988) : G. J. Parsons (47)
 Jack Parsons (1910–1934) : J. H. Parsons (312)
 Norman Partridge (1921–1937) : N. E. Partridge (100)
 Jeetan Patel (2009–2020) : J. S. Patel (124)
 Nigel Paul (1954–1955) : N. A. Paul (4)
 William Peare (1926) : W. G. Peare (7)
 Godfrey Pell (1947) : G. A. Pell (1)
 Trevor Penney (1991/92–2003) : T. L. Penney (146)
 Edward Pereira (1895–1896) : E. T. Pereira (5)
 Hubert Perkins (1926–1927) : H. G. Perkins (4)
 Stephen Perryman (1974–1981) : S. P. Perryman (131)
 Hugh Phillips (1951) : H. R. Phillips (1)
 Joseph Phillips (1904–1911) : J. H. Phillips (6)
 Adrian Pierson (1985–1991) : A. R. K. Pierson (57)
 Steffan Piolet (2009–2013) : S. A. Piolet (4)
 Keith Piper (1989–2005) : K. J. Piper (193)
 Ed Pollock (2019–2020) : E. J. Pollock (List A only)
 Shaun Pollock (1996–2002) : S. M. Pollock (23)
 Navdeep Poonia (2006–2009) : N. S. Poonia (14)
 William Porterfield (2011–2017) : W. T. S. Porterfield (70)
 Wilfred Potter (1932) : W. Potter (1)
 Mike Powell (1996–2008) : M. J. Powell (133)
 Rowland Powell-Williams (1897–1898) : R. Powell-Williams (5)
 Stuart Poynter (2013) : S. W. Poynter (1)
 Josh Poysden (2015–2018) : J. E. Poysden (7)
 Dewald Pretorius (2004–2005) : D. Pretorius (15)
 Reggie Pridmore (1909–1912) : R. G. Pridmore (14)
 Tom Pritchard (1946–1955) : T. L. Pritchard (170)
 John Pugh (1922–1927) : J. G. Pugh (9)

Q
 Bernard Quaife (1920–1926) : B. W. Quaife (48)
 Walter Quaife (1894–1901) : W. Quaife (121)
 Willie Quaife (1894–1928) : W. G. Quaife (665)

R
 Boyd Rankin (2008–2017) : W. B. Rankin (88)
 David Ratcliffe (1957–1968) : D. P. Ratcliffe (20)
 Jason Ratcliffe (1988–1994) : J. D. Ratcliffe (78)
 Dermot Reeve (1988–1996) : D. A. Reeve (141)
 James Rhodes (1895) : J. Rhodes (3)
 Thomas Rhodes (1899) : T. B. Rhodes (4)
 Will Rhodes (2018–2020) : W. H. M. Rhodes (34)
 Ignatius Rice (1920) : W. I. Rice (2)
 Walter Richards (1895–1896) : W. Richards (7)
 Alan Richardson (1999–2004) : A. Richardson (63)
 Bryan Richardson (1963–1967) : B. A. Richardson (40)
 Stanley Richardson (1920) : S. H. Richardson (2)
 Terence Riley (1961–1964) : T. M. N. Riley (12)
 Harry Roberts (1949–1950) : H. E. Roberts (5)
 Harley Roberts (1932–1937) : H. J. Roberts (17)
 Derrick Robins (1947) : D. H. Robins (2)
 Maurice Robinson (1951–1952) : M. Robinson (8)
 Lloyd Robinson (1946) : T. L. Robinson (4)
 Henry Roll (1927) : H. T. Roll (1)
 Gerard Rotherham (1919–1921) : G. A. Rotherham (44)
 Hugh Rotherham (1903) : H. Rotherham (1)
 Stephen Rouse (1970–1981) : S. J. Rouse (124)
 John Russell (1920) : J. B. Russell (1)

S
 Dick Sale (1939–1947) : R. Sale (19)
 Ian Salisbury (2008) : I. D. K. Salisbury (13)
 Wilfred Sanders (1928–1934) : W. Sanders (84)
 Gerald Sanderson (1901) : G. B. Sanderson (1)
 Kumar Sangakkara (2007) : K. C. Sangakkara (7)
 Reg Santall (1919–1939) : F. R. Santall (496)
 Sydney Santall (1894–1914) : S. Santall (371)
 Richard Savage (1976–1979) : R. L. Savage (23)
 Reginald Scorer (1921–1926) : R. I. Scorer (29)
 Adam Shantry (2006–2007) : A. J. Shantry (3)
 Norman Sharp (1923) : N. Sharp (1)
 Dennis Shaw (1949) : D. G. Shaw (1)
 Mohammed Sheikh (1997–2003) : M. A. Sheikh (20)
 John Shilton (1894–1895) : J. E. Shilton (19)
 Norman Shortland (1938–1950) : N. A. Shortland (23)
 Shozair Ali (2013) : Shozair Ali
 Charles Shuckburgh (1930) : C. G. S. Shuckburgh (1)
 Dominic Sibley (2017–2020) : D. P. Sibley (34)
 Ryan Sidebottom (2017–2020) : R. N. Sidebottom (18)
 Harry Simms (1921–1922) : H. L. Simms (5)
 Anurag Singh (1995–2000) : A. Singh (21)
 Sukhjit Singh (2017–2018) : Sukhjit Singh (6)
 Swaranjit Singh (1956–1958) : S. Singh (27)
 Gladstone Small (1980–1997) : G. C. Small (272)
 Cyril Smart (1920–1922) : C. C. Smart (45)
 Jack Smart (1919–1936) : J. A. Smart (238)
 Alan Smith (1958–1974) : A. C. Smith (358)
 David (Martin) Smith (1981–1983) : D. M. Smith (4)
 Tiger Smith (1904–1930) : E. J. Smith (444)
 Gareth Smith (1990) : G. Smith (1)
 Harry Smith (1912) : H. W. Smith (1)
 Irving Smith (1905) : I. W. Smith (1)
 (Kenneth) David Smith (1973–1985) : K. D. Smith (196)
 M. J. K. Smith (1956–1975) : M. J. K. Smith (430)
 Neil Smith (1987–2003) : N. M. K. Smith (205)
 Paul Smith (1982–1996) : P. A. Smith (221)
 William Smith (1906) : W. J. Smith (1)
 Andrew Speed (1927–1928) : A. W. Speed (8)
 Harry Spencer (1930) : H. N. E. Spencer (3)
 Jamie Spires (2001–2002) : J. A. S. Spires (7)
 Dick Spooner (1948–1959) : R. T. Spooner (312)
 Sreesanth (2009) : S. Sreesanth (5)
 Frank Stephens (1907–1912) : F. G. Stephens (32)
 George Stephens (1907–1925) : G. W. Stephens (123)
 John Stevenson (1919) : J. F. Stevenson (1)
 Jim Stewart (1955–1969) : W. J. P. Stewart (279)
 Dale Steyn (2007) : D. W. Steyn (7)
 Oli Stone (2017–2020) : O. P. Stone (12)
 Alastair Storie (1987–1988) : A. C. Storie (25)
 Heath Streak (2004–2007) : H. H. Streak (41)
 Lawrence Street (1946) : L. C. Street (4)
 Norman Street (1908) : N. K. Street (5)
 Ernest Suckling (1919) : E. Suckling (1)
 Simon Sutcliffe (1981–1983) : S. P. Sutcliffe (20)

T
 Cecil Tate (1931–1933) : C. F. Tate (7)
 Frederick Tayler (1910) : F. E. Tayler (4)
 Albert Taylor (1927) : A. E. Taylor (1)
 Arthur Taylor (1913) : A. Taylor (6)
 Charles Taylor (1908–1909) : C. J. Taylor (3)
 Chilton Taylor (1970) : C. R. V. Taylor (1)
 Derief Taylor (1948–1950) : D. D. S. Taylor (16)
 Don Taylor (1949–1953) : D. D. Taylor (45)
 Frederick Taylor (1939) : F. Taylor (1)
 Ken Taylor (1946–1949) : K. A. Taylor (87)
 Geoffrey Tedstone (1982–1988) : G. A. Tedstone (32)
 Peter Tennant (1964) : P. N. Tennant (1)
 Alfonso Thomas (2007) : A. C. Thomas (4)
 Gary Thomas (1978–1981) : G. P. Thomas (8)
 John Thompson (1938–1954) : J. R. Thompson (44)
 Roly Thompson (1949–1962) : R. G. Thompson (157)
 Alex Thomson (2017–2020) : A. T. Thomson (9)
 David Thorne (1983–1989) : D. A. Thorne (43)
 Grant Thornton (2017) : G. T. Thornton (2)
 Warwick Tidy (1970–1974) : W. N. Tidy (36)
 Brian Timms (1969–1971) : B. S. V. Timms (24)
 Alan Townsend (1948–1960) : A. Townsend (340)
 Jonathan Trott (2003–2018) : I. J. L. Trott (187)
 Jim Troughton (2001–2014) : J. O. Troughton (165)
 Richard Tudor (1996) : R. T. Tudor (1)
 Roger Twose (1989–1995) : R. G. Twose (87)
 George Tyler (1919) : G. E. Tyler (1)

U
 Andrew Umeed (2016–2018) : A. R. I. Umeed (14)

V
 Horace Venn (1919–1925) : H. Venn (34)
 Daniel Vettori (2006) : D. L. Vettori (1)

W
 Mick Waddy (1919–1922) : E. F. Waddy (26)
 Graham Wagg (2002–2004) : G. G. Wagg (8)
 Mark Wagh (1997–2006) : M. A. Wagh (112)
 James Wainman (2019) : J. C. Wainman (1)
 Gilbert Walker (1912) : G. Walker (1)
 Stephen Wall (1984–1985) : S. Wall (19)
 Waqar Younis (2003) : Waqar Younis (8)
 Leslie Ward (1930) : L. M. Ward (1)
 William Ward (1895–1904) : W. Ward (11)
 John Waring (1967) : J. S. Waring (1)
 Graham Warner (1966–1971) : G. S. Warner (30)
 Nick Warren (2002–2005) : N. A. Warren (8)
 Wasim Khan (1995–1997) : Wasim Khan (31)
 Albert Wassell (1923) : A. Wassell (7)
 Thomas Watson (1904) : T. H. Watson (2)
 Jonathon Webb (2015) : J. P. Webb (2)
 Rudi Webster (1962–1966) : R. V. Webster (60)
 Ray Weeks (1950–1957) : R. T. Weeks (105)
 Graeme Welch (1991–2000) : G. Welch (77)
 George Weldrick (1906–1907) : G. Weldrick (8)
 James Welford (1896) : J. W. Welford (13)
 Ian Westwood (2003–2017) : I. J. Westwood (159)
 Ossie Wheatley (1957–1960) : O. S. Wheatley (63)
 Allan White (1936–1937) : A. F. T. White (9)
 Henry White (1923) : H. A. White (8)
 Malcolm White (1946) : M. F. White (1)
 James Whitehead (1902) : J. G. Whitehead (1)
 James Whitehead (1894–1900) : S. J. Whitehead (55)
 John Whitehouse (1971–1980) : J. Whitehouse (179)
 Percy Whitehouse (1926) : P. G. Whitehouse (3)
 Albert Whittle (1900–1906) : A. E. M. Whittle (60)
 Owen Williams (1967) : O. L. Williams (1)
 Bob Willis (1972–1984) : R. G. D. Willis (136)
 Kilburn Wilmot (1931–1939) : K. Wilmot (75)
 Ben Wilson (1951) : B. A. Wilson (1)
 Jimmy Windridge (1909–1913) : J. E. Windridge (7)
 Chris Woakes (2006–2018) : C. R. Woakes (94)
 Bert Wolton (1947–1960) : A. V. G. Wolton (296)
 Alfred Woodroffe (1947–1948) : A. Woodroffe (4)
 Simon Wootton (1981–1983) : S. H. Wootton (11)
 Albert Wright (1960–1964) : A. Wright (76)
 Chris Wright (2011–2018) : C. J. C. Wright (86)
 Bob Wyatt (1923–1939) : R. E. S. Wyatt (404)

Y
 Rob Yates (2019–2020) : R. M. Yates (17)
 Michael Youll (1956–1957) : M. Youll (4)

Z
 Monde Zondeki (2008) : M. Zondeki (4)

List A/Twenty20 cricketers

The following players appeared for Warwickshire in one or more List A or Twenty20 match, but did not play any first-class matches for the county first eleven.

 Neville Bulpitt, 3 matches, 1979
 Steven Dean, 1 match, 1993
 Damien Fleming, 1 match, 2002
 Dean Hodgson, 1 match, 1987
 Huw Jones, 1 match, 2002
 Tom Lewis, 8 matches, 2015
 Brendon McCullum, 7 matches, 2015
 Alfie Sam, 2 matches, 1979
 Shoaib Malik, 6 matches, 2014
 John Snow, 7 matches, 1980
 Aaron Thomason, 1 match, 2014
 Vaughn van Jaarsveld, 1 match, 2007

References

Players

Warwickshire
Cricketers